Benjamin Brown (née Lipshitz), (1885 – 1939), was a Ukrainian-Jewish immigrant to the United States, a social idealist who developed a Jewish Agricultural cooperative settlement in Clarion, Utah, and an Agro-Industrial cooperative settlement in Jersey Homesteads, Roosevelt, New Jersey. 

Brown attained wealth through a poultry exchange he established between Western states and New York after the failure of the Clarion effort in 1916. In 1933, Brown attempted to reestablish a new Jewish cooperative effort in rural Monmouth County, N.J. employing seasonally employed Jewish textile workers largely from New York City.

References

External links
History of Roosevelt, New Jersey

1885 births
1939 deaths
People from Roosevelt, New Jersey